The Players is a 2020 Italian comedy film directed by Stefano Mordini, written by Filippo Bologna and Stefano Mordini and starring Riccardo Scamarcio, Valerio Mastandrea and Laura Chiatti. It's a remake of the 2012 French movie of the same name.

Cast 
 Riccardo Scamarcio as Lorenzo
 Valerio Mastandrea as Favini
 Laura Chiatti as Silvia		
 Valentina Cervi as Lisa
 Marina Foïs as Wife
 Alessia Giuliani as Cristina		
 Filipo Bolonia as Rudi	
 Massimiliano Gallo as Zordini		
 Aglaia Mora as Natalia
 Arianna Ninchi as Giulia	
 Lorenzo Salpini as Vittorio
 Paolo de Pascale as Marcelo
 Lucilla Silvani as Burbera
 Francesca Sorbelli as Valeria

Release
The Players was released on July 15, 2020 on Netflix.

References

External links
 
 

2020 films
2020 comedy films
2020s Italian-language films
Italian comedy films
Italian-language Netflix original films
Films directed by Stefano Mordini
2020s Italian films